Leroy "Roy" Buchanan (September 23, 1939 – August 14, 1988) was an American guitarist and blues musician. A pioneer of the Telecaster sound, Buchanan worked as a sideman and as a solo artist, with two gold albums early in his career and two later solo albums that made it to the Billboard chart. He never achieved stardom, but is considered a highly influential guitar player. Guitar Player praised him as having one of the "50 Greatest Tones of All Time." He appeared on the PBS music program Austin City Limits in 1977 (season 2).

Biography

Birth and early career: 1939-1960
Leroy Buchanan was born in Ozark, Arkansas, and was raised there and in Pixley, California, a farming area between Visalia and Bakersfield. His father was a sharecropper in Arkansas and a farm laborer in California. Buchanan told interviewers that his father was also a Pentecostal preacher, a note repeated in Guitar Player magazine but disputed by his older brother J.D. Buchanan told how his first musical memories were of racially mixed revival meetings he attended with his mother, Minnie. "Gospel," he recalled, "that's how I first got into black music." He in fact drew upon many disparate influences while learning to play the guitar (though he later claimed his aptitude derived from being "half-wolf"). He initially showed talent on steel guitar before switching to guitar in the early 50s, and started his professional career at age 15, in Johnny Otis's rhythm and blues revue.

In 1958, Buchanan made his recording debut with Chicago's Chess Records at age 19, accompanying Dale Hawkins by playing the solo on "My Babe." Two years later, during a tour through Toronto, Buchanan left Dale Hawkins to play for Hawkins's cousin Ronnie Hawkins and tutor Ronnie's guitar player, Robbie Robertson. Buchanan plays bass on the Ronnie Hawkins single "Who Do You Love?".  Buchanan soon returned to the United States, and members of the Ronnie Hawkins' group later gained fame as the roots rock group the Band. In the early 1960s, Buchanan often played as a sideman with various rock bands, and he played guitar in recording sessions with Freddy Cannon, Merle Kilgore, and others. At the end of the 1960s, with a growing family, Buchanan left the music industry to learn a trade and trained as a hairdresser (barber).

Recording career: 1961-1988
In 1961 he released "Mule Train Stomp", his first single for Swan, featuring rich guitar tones. Buchanan's 1962 recording with drummer Bobby Gregg, nicknamed "Potato Peeler," first introduced the trademark Buchanan "pinch" harmonic. An effort to cash in on the British Invasion caught Buchanan with the British Walkers. In the mid-1960s, Buchanan settled down in the Washington, D.C., area, playing for Danny Denver's band for many years while acquiring a reputation as "...one of the very finest rock guitarists around. Jimi Hendrix would not take up the challenge of a 'pick-off' with Roy." The facts behind that claim are that in March 1968 a photographer friend, John Gossage gave Buchanan tickets to a concert by the Jimi Hendrix Experience at the Washington Hilton. "Buchanan was dismayed to find his own trademark sounds, like the wah-wah that he'd painstakingly produced with his hands and his Telecaster, created by electronic pedals. He could never attempt Hendrix's stage show, and this realization refocused him on his own quintessentially American roots-style guitar picking."

Gossage recalls how Roy was very impressed by the Hendrix 1967 debut album Are You Experienced?, which was why he made sure to give Roy a ticket to the early show at the Hilton. Gossage went backstage to take photos and tried to convince Jimi to go and see Roy at the Silver Dollar that night after the show, but Jimi seemed more interested in hanging out with the young lady who was backstage with him. Hendrix never showed up at the Silver Dollar, but Gossage did talk to Roy about seeing the Hilton show. That same night (as the Hilton show) Roy did several Hendrix numbers and "from that point on, had nothing but good things to say about Hendrix". He later released recordings of the Hendrix composition "If 6 Was 9" and the Hendrix hit "Hey Joe" (written by Billy Roberts and first recorded by The Leaves). In the early 1970s he performed in the Washington, D.C.–Maryland–Virginia area with the Danny Denver Band, which had a following in the area. Buchanan was also popular as a solo act in the D.C. area at this time.

Buchanan's life changed in 1971, when he gained national notice as the result of an hour-long PBS television documentary. Entitled Introducing Roy Buchanan, and sometimes mistakenly called The Best Unknown Guitarist in the World, it earned a record deal with Polydor Records and praise from John Lennon and Merle Haggard, besides an alleged invitation to join the Rolling Stones which he turned down and which gave him the nickname "the man who turned the Stones down". He may have turned the Stones down for two reasons. He may have feared abusing drugs and alcohol more if he joined them, and dying, like Brian Jones. And he may have felt that his own career as he was then pursuing it had promising directions that he could not follow as well if he joined the Stones. In 1977, he appeared on the PBS music program Austin City Limits during Season 2. He recorded five albums for Polydor, one of which, Second Album, went gold, and after that another three for Atlantic Records, one of which, 1977's Loading Zone, also went gold. Buchanan quit recording in 1981, vowing never to enter a studio again unless he could record his own music his own way. Four years later, Alligator Records coaxed Buchanan back into the studio.

His first album for Alligator, When a Guitar Plays the Blues, was released in the spring of 1985. It was the first time he had total artistic freedom in the studio. His second Alligator LP, Dancing on the Edge (with vocals on three tracks by Delbert McClinton), was released in the fall of 1986. He released the twelfth and last album of his career, Hot Wires, in 1987. Buchanan's last show was on August 7, 1988, at Guilford Fairgrounds in Guilford, Connecticut.

Death

According to his agent and others, Buchanan was doing well, having gained control of his drinking habit and playing again, when he was arrested for public intoxication after a domestic dispute. He was found hanged from his own shirt in a jail cell on August 14, 1988, in the Fairfax County, Virginia, Jail. According to Thomas Hartman, who was in a cell near Buchanan's, the deputy sheriff opened the door early in the morning and found Buchanan with the shirt around his neck. His cause of death was officially recorded as suicide, a finding disputed by Buchanan's friends and family. One of his friends, Marc Fisher, reported seeing Roy's body with bruises on the head.

After his death, compilation and other albums continue to be released, including in 2004 the never-released first album he recorded for Polydor, The Prophet. Roy Buchanan is interred at Columbia Gardens Cemetery in Arlington, Virginia.

Equipment
Buchanan used a number of guitars in his career, although he was most often associated with a 1953 Fender Telecaster, serial number 2324, nicknamed "Nancy." At some point "Nancy" had jumbo frets installed, but remained largely original. There are two very different stories explaining how Buchanan got the guitar. He himself said that, while enrolled in 1969 in a school to learn to be a hairdresser, he ran after a guy walking down the street with that guitar, and bought him a purple Telecaster to trade. Buchanan also owned a Butterscotch Blonde 1952 Fender Telecaster that eventually wound up in the possession of Wishbone Ash guitarist Andy Powell. A friend of Buchanan's, however, said that Buchanan was playing a Gibson Les Paul at the time, and traded it for the '53 Tele. One of Buchanan's Telecasters was later owned by Danny Gatton and Mike Stern, who lost it in a robbery. He was reported using a 1956 Gibson Les Paul Goldtop Reissue for some time. Early in 1979 he switched to a 1975 sunburst Fender Stratocaster for a few years. Also, he used to play a Gibson L-5 CES when he was very young.

Tone and technique
Buchanan played the Telecaster through a Fender Vibrolux
amplifier with the volume and tone "full out," and used the guitar's volume and tone controls to control volume and sound (he achieved a wah wah effect using the tone control). To achieve his desired distorted sounds, Buchanan at one point used a razor blade to slit the paper cones of the speakers in his amp, an approach also employed by the Kinks' Dave Davies and others. Buchanan rarely used effects pedals, though he started using an Echoplex on A Street Called Straight (1976). In his later career he played with a Boss DD-2 delay.

Buchanan taught himself various playing techniques, including "chicken picking". He sometimes used his thumb nail rather than a plectrum, and also employed it to augment his index finger and pick. Holding the pick between his thumb and forefinger, Buchanan also plucked the string and simultaneously touched it lightly with the lower edge of his thumb at one of the harmonic nodes, thus suppressing lower overtones and emphasising the harmonic, sometimes referred to as pinch harmonics, though Buchanan called it an "overtone." Buchanan could play harmonics at will, and could mute individual strings with free right-hand fingers while picking or pinching others. He was famous as well for his oblique bends.

This was particularly notable in his approach to using double and triple stops.

Legacy
Buchanan has influenced many guitarists, including Robbie Robertson, Gary Moore, Danny Gatton, Arlen Roth, Jeff Beck, David Gilmour, Jerry Garcia, Mick Ronson, Nils Lofgren, Jim Campilongo, and Steve Kimock; Beck dedicated his version of "Cause We've Ended As Lovers" from Blow by Blow to him. His work is said to "stretch the limits of the electric guitar," and he is praised for "his subtlety of tone and the breadth of his knowledge, from the blackest of blues to moaning R&B and clean, concise, bone-deep rock 'n' roll." 
In 2004, Guitar Player listed his version of "Sweet Dreams," from his debut album on Polydor, Roy Buchanan, as having one of the "50 Greatest Tones of All Time." In the same year, the readers of Guitar Player voted Buchanan #46 in a top 50 readers' poll.

Discography

Studio albums
Buch and the Snakestretchers, 1971, BIOYA (homemade/self-produced/sold only at gigs)
Roy Buchanan, August 1972, Polydor - US #107
Second Album, March 1973, Polydor  - US #86
That's What I Am Here For, November 1973, Polydor  - US #152
In the Beginning (UK title: Rescue Me), December 1974, Polydor  - US #160
A Street Called Straight, April 1976, Atlantic  - US #148
Loading Zone, May 1977, Atlantic  - US #105
You're Not Alone, April 1978, Atlantic  - US #119
My Babe, November 1980, Waterhouse/AJK - US #193
When a Guitar Plays the Blues, July 1985, Alligator - US #161
Dancing on the Edge, June 1986, Alligator - US #153
Hot Wires, September 1987, Alligator

Live albums
Live Stock, (rec. 1974) August 1975, Polydor
Live in Japan, (rec. 1977) 1978, Polydor [Japan]
Live: Charly Blues Legend, Vol. 9, 1987, Charly
Live in U.S.A. & Holland, (rec. 1977–85) 1991, Silver Shadow
Charly Blues Masterworks: Roy Buchanan Live, 1999, Charly/Red X
American Axe: Live in 1974, 2003, Powerhouse
Live: Amazing Grace, (rec. 1974–83) 2009, Powerhouse
Live at Rockpalast, (rec. 1985) 2011, MIG Music
Live from Austin, TX (rec. 1976) 2012, New West
Shredding the Blues: Live at My Father's Place, (rec. 1978 & 1984) 2014, Rockbeat
Telemaster: Live in '75, 2017, Powerhouse
Live at Town Hall 1974, 2018, Real Gone Music

Compilation albums
The Best of Roy Buchanan, 1982, Polydor
The Early Years, 1989, Krazy Kat
Sweet Dreams: The Anthology, 1992, Polydor
Guitar on Fire: The Atlantic Sessions, 1993, Rhino/Atlantic
Malaguena, 1996, Annecillo
Before And After: The Last Recordings, 1999, Rollercoaster Records UK
Deluxe Edition: Roy Buchanan, 2001, Alligator
20th Century Masters–The Millennium Collection: The Best of Roy Buchanan, 2002, Polydor
The Prophet: The Unreleased First Polydor Album, 2004, Hip-O Select/UMe
The Definitive Collection, 2006, Polydor/UMe
Rhino Hi-Five: Roy Buchanan, 2007, Rhino/Atlantic
After Hours: The Early Years, 1957–1962 Recordings, 2016, Soul Jam

References

External links

Biography, Discography and Photo Gallery

1939 births
1988 suicides
People from Ozark, Arkansas
American blues guitarists
American male guitarists
American rock guitarists
American country guitarists
American rockabilly guitarists
Burials at Arlington National Cemetery
Suicides by hanging in Virginia
Lead guitarists
People who committed suicide in prison custody
American people who died in prison custody
Prisoners who died in Virginia detention
American blues singers
20th-century American guitarists
20th-century American singers
Country musicians from Arkansas
20th-century American male musicians
Alligator Records artists